Div Dasht (also Romanized as Dīv Dasht) is a village in Ganjafruz Rural District, in the Central District of Babol County, Mazandaran Province, Iran. At the 2006 census, its population was 485, in 130 families.

References 

Populated places in Babol County